The women's individual pursuit at the 2008 Dutch National Track Championships in Apeldoorn took place at Omnisport Apeldoorn from 29 December to 30 December 2008. 12 athletes participated in the contest.

Ellen van Dijk won for the second consecutive time the gold medal, Kirsten Wild took silver and Vera Koedooder won the bronze.

Preview
Ellen van Dijk, the champion of 2007 was the main favourite to win the title. Van Dijk finished earlier the year second at the 2008 European Track Championships and fifth at the 2008 Track Cycling World Championships and became European time trial champion at the 2008 European Road Championships. Elise van Hage, who also participated and finished 16h in the individual pursuit at the European Track Championships, did not participate.

Competition format
The tournament started with a qualifying round. The two fastest qualifiers advanced to the gold medal final. The numbers three and four competed against each other for the bronze medal.

Schedule
Monday 29 December
15:10 Qualifying
Tuesday 30 December
11:00 Finals

Results

Finals
Bronze medal match

Gold medal match

Final results

Results from adelaar.cms.nederland.net

References

2008 Dutch National track cycling championships
Dutch National Track Championships – Women's individual pursuit